Talitrus saltator, a species of sand hopper, is a common amphipod crustacean of sandy coasts around Europe. The animal's typical "hopping" movement gives it its common name, and is produced by a flexion of the abdomen. In order to do this, it must stand on its legs (amphipods usually rest on their sides) and suddenly extend its abdomen from under its body. It can thus leap several inches into the air, although without any control over its direction. A great deal of scientific research has been carried out on the animal, to determine the environmental cues which it uses to control its behavior.

Description
The body is grayish-brown or grayish-green in colour, with a single pair of black eyes. It has a distinct pair of antennae, with one antenna as more robust than the other.

Distribution
Talitrus saltator is found around the coasts of the North Sea and north-east Atlantic Ocean from southern Norway  to the Mediterranean Sea.

Life cycle
Mating occurs in T. saltator once the photoperiod exceeds 14 hours; this is in contrast to other shoreline animals such as isopods which use air temperature or sea temperature to control breeding times. Mating occurs during the animal's nightly migration down the beach, after the female has moulted. Broods of 13–15 eggs are carried by the females. When they first hatch, juveniles are sensitive to desiccation but are unable to burrow, and so they live in washed up seaweed with a humidity of 85%–90%. Although the juveniles become sexually differentiated within a few months, they do not contribute to the second reproductive wave later in the year, but first reproduce the following year. Females die before the males, in their second winter (males live for 21 months, compared to 18 months for females).

Ecology
They are capable of navigating where the sea is using multiple indicators; including the angle of the sun, moon, or even by detecting the blue wavelengths of light from the sea and the red-brown colors of land. Their diet is composed chiefly of the rotting seaweed which accumulates on the strandline. T. saltator is an important food source for shore birds.

References

Further reading

External links
 

Gammaridea
Crustaceans of Europe
Crustaceans of the Atlantic Ocean
Crustaceans described in 1808
IUCN Red List data deficient species